A UAV is an unmanned aerial vehicle, commonly known as a drone.

UAV may also refer to:

Drones
 UAV Cypher or Sikorsky Cypher, a type of unmanned aerial vehicle developed by Sikorsky Aircraft
 UAV Outback Challenge or UAV Challenge - Outback Rescue, an annual competition for the development of unmanned aerial vehicles
 UAV Sci-Tech UAV, Chinese UCAVs developed by Beijing UAV Sci-Tech Co., Ltd
 Unmanned combat aerial vehicle (UCAV), also known as a combat drone or simply a drone
 Vrabac Mini UAV, a mini drone intended for day/night reconnaissance and surveillance at shorter distances, as well as for target finding and designating

Organizations
 UAV Corporation or UAV Entertainment
 Ukrainian American Veterans
 University of Antelope Valley